Ready to Be is the twelfth extended play by South Korean group Twice. It was released on March 10, 2023, through JYP Entertainment and Republic Records. It consists of seven tracks, including the lead single "Set Me Free", and follows the release of the group's second English-language single, "Moonlight Sunrise".

Background 
Ready to Be follows the release of "Moonlight Sunrise", Twice's second English single, and is their first Korean release in 2023. The album as whole is a work that revolves around "Twice's firm determination to break away from the world's gaze, prejudice and face the real 'me'."

Composition
"Set Me Free" is a disco track characterized by a groovy bass line, "simple yet powerful sound", and liberating lyrics. The lyrics revolve around the protagonists finding the courage to confess their love to a crush, with lines such as "I've been hiding how I feel for you forever" and "Now that it's off my chest there's room for you and me". The second track is pre-release single "Moonlight Sunrise", a Miami bass and R&B song written by Earattack and Lee Woo-hyun, and co-written by Nina Ann Nelson and Kaedi Dalley of Citizen Queen.

"Got the Thrills" is a Balearic beat-influenced dance-pop song produced by JYP Entertainment's in-house producer Lee Woo-min "Collapsedone". Lai Frances, writing for Uproxx, noted that it could be considered the sequel to "Talk That Talk" (also produced by Collapsedone) due to its similar synths and chord progressions. Twice member Dahyun wrote the lyrics to two tracks on the album, rock and blues song "Blame It on Me" and pop rock song "Crazy Stupid Love".

Release and promotion
On February 3, 2023, Twice officially announced the album's title, cover and the release date for March 10, 2023. The group revealed the official tracklist on February 17. On March 4, a pop-up experience was held in Los Angeles in support of the album's release. On March 6 and 7, the group released two teasers for the music video.

Shortly after the album's release, Twice performed "Set Me Free" on The Tonight Show Starring Jimmy Fallon.

Critical reception 

Rolling Stone'''s Tim Chan gave the album a positive review, stating that Twice "blows up the tired stereotypes and smashes through barriers with a seven-song set that’s as brash and compelling as anything in the pop music landscape today". Rhian Daly of NME gave the album a rating of four out of five stars, noting that it further refines Twice's sophisticated and retro-inspired sound, despite some "awkward junctures".

 Commercial performance 
On March 8, it was reported that pre-order sales of Ready to Be had surpassed 1.7 million copies, breaking the group's own album pre-order record.Ready to Be'' debuted at number two on the US Billboard 200 with 153,000 album-equivalent units, including 145,500 pure album sales. It marks Twice's fourth US top-10 album and their highest-charting album in the US to date, as well as their biggest week by units.

Track listing

Personnel 
Credits adapted from Melon and album liner notes.

Musicians 

 Twice – vocals
 Dahyun – lyricist 
 Ciara Muscat – composer 
 Earattack – arranger, bass, drum programming, keyboard, producer, songwriter 
 Greg Bonnick – composer 
 Hayden Chapman – composer 
 JQ – lyricist 
 Jvde (Galactika) – lyricist 
 Kaedi Dalley – songwriter 
 Lara Andersson – composer 
 LDN Noise – arranger, producer 
 Lee Won-jong – arranger, composer, guitar, producer, keyboard, synthesizer 
 Lee Woo-hyun – arranger, bass, drum programming, keyboard, producer, songwriter 
 Lee Woo-min "Collapsedone" – arranger, composer, electric guitar, keyboards, producer 
 Lenno Linjama – arranger, composer, producer 
 Lindgren – arranger, composer, producer , lyricist 
 Lostboy – arranger, producer 
 Marty Maro – composer 
 Melanie Fontana – background vocals, composer , lyricist 
 Mrch – background vocals, composer, lyricist 
 Nicole Neely – strings 
 Nina Ann Nelson – songwriter 
 Peter Rycroft – composer, all instruments 
 Shorelle – background vocals, composer 
 Sla – composer 
 Sophia Pae – background vocals 
 Sound Kim – background vocals 
 Star Wars (Galactika) – lyricist 
 Tayla Parx – composer 
 Young Chance – background vocals, composer

Technical 

 Curtis Douglas – mixing 
 Earattack – vocal director , recording 
 Friday (Galactika) – vocal director 
 Gu Hye-jin – recording 
 Haneul Lee – immersive mix engineering
 Im Chan-mi – recording 
 Jung-hoon Choi – immersive mix engineering
 Jvde (Galactika) – vocal director 
 Kang Sun-young – digital editing 
 Kwon Nam-woo – mastering
 Lee Kyung-won – digital editing 
 Lee Tae-seop – mixing 
 Lee Won-jong – digital editing, vocal director 
 Lee Woo-min "Collapsedone" – computer programming 
 Park Nam-joon – digital editing, mix engineering 
 Shin Bong-won – mixing 
 Sophia Pae – vocal director 
 Young Chance – digital editing, vocal director

Charts

Release history

References 

2023 EPs
Twice (group) EPs
JYP Entertainment EPs
Republic Records EPs